In computing, the Red Hat Virtual Machine Manager, also known as virt-manager, is a desktop virtual machine monitor.

Features 
Virtual Machine Manager allows users to:

 create, edit, start and stop VMs 
 view and control each VM's console
 see performance and utilization statistics for each VM
 view all running VMs and hosts, and their live performance or resource utilization statistics. 
 use KVM, Xen or QEMU virtual machines, running either locally or remotely.
 use LXC containers

Support for FreeBSD's bhyve hypervisor has been included since 2014, though it remains disabled by default.

Distributions including Virtual Machine Manager 

Virtual Machine Manager comes as the  package in:

 Arch Linux
 CentOS
 Debian (since lenny)
 Fedora (since version 6)
 FreeBSD (via Ports collection)
 Frugalware
 Gentoo
 Mandriva Linux (since release 2007.1)
 MXLinux 
 NetBSD (via pkgsrc)
 NixOS
 OpenBSD (via Ports collection)
 openSUSE (since release 10.3)
 Red Hat Enterprise Linux (versions 5 through 7 only)
 Scientific Linux
 Trisquel
 TrueOS
 Ubuntu (version 8.04 and above)
 Void Linux

See also

 libvirt, the API used by Virtual Machine Manager to create and manage virtual machines

References

External links

Documentation 
While the Virtual Machine Manager project itself lacks documentation, there are third parties providing relevant information, e.g.:
 Red Hat Enterprise Linux virtualization 7 documentation (VMM is not used in RHEL 8 and later):
Getting Started with Virtual Machine Manager
 Fedora documentation:
Getting started with virtualization
 Ubuntu official documentation:
KVM/VirtManager
Libvirt documentation:
Documentation: index
Documentation: Storage pools
Documentation: Network management architecture
Wiki: Virtual networking

Free virtualization software
Red Hat software
Remote administration software
Software that uses PyGObject
Virtualization
Virtualization software for Linux
Virtualization software that uses GTK